Ira Bernstein (b. Malverne, New York, 1959) is a dancer and teacher in the United States who specializes in traditional American dance forms such as Appalachian-style clogging, flatfoot dancing, tap dance, and step dancing. He is considered an authority on clogging, and the leading figure in this dance style. He calls himself a "percussive step dancer who specializes in Appalachian flatfooting," and also dances Green Grass style Appalachian clogging, English clogging, French-Canadian step dancing, Irish step dancing, and South African gumboot dancing.

Background and career
Bernstein was born and grew up in Malverne, New York, a suburb of New York City. Three of his four grandparents were of Russian and Polish Ashkenazic descent, and immigrated to the United States through Ellis Island around 1900. The fourth, his maternal grandfather, was born in Harlem, New York and was of German descent.

He attended the University of Pennsylvania from 1977 to 1981. It was there, in 1978, that he first became interested in traditional American dance and music. He is also an old-time fiddler, having also taken up the instrument while at the University of Pennsylvania. In 1981 he received a B.A. degree in the Biological Basis of Behavior, Summa Cum Laude with Honors, Phi Beta Kappa and University Scholars. He was accepted into a joint Ph.D./DVM program but turned it down to pursue a career in dance.

Following his graduation, he lived in Marlboro, Vermont, where he apprenticed with Anthony Barrand, a specialist in English clog dancing and Morris dancing. Barrand was a mentor to Bernstein and exposed him to English, Irish, and Canadian clog and step dancing. He gave Bernstein private lessons in traditional English dance styles, and gave him unlimited access to his film archive. Bernstein then lived in the Washington, D.C./Baltimore, Maryland/Annapolis, Maryland area in 1983 and 1984, while performing with Fiddle Puppets. In 1985 he moved back to Malverne, New York to study tap dancing with Sandman Sims, for which he received a National Endowment for the Arts Apprentice Fellowship grant. He moved to Asheville, North Carolina in 1996.

Bernstein has performed throughout the United States, and toured in Canada, Europe, the Middle East, Turkey, and Japan. He directs the Ten Toe Percussion Ensemble, a group of step dance soloists, and has been a member of the Mill Creek Cloggers, Fiddle Puppets, Marlboro Morris and Sword, American Tap Dance Orchestra, and The Vanaver Caravan. He was a guest soloist with Rhythm in Shoes and was the lead soloist in the show Rhythms of the Celts, which ran for six weeks at the Waterfront Theatre in Belfast. He has frequently performed with the old-time musician Riley Baugus, with the duo show Appalachian Roots. He was the co-creator and co-artistic director of Mountain Legacy, a large-scale stage show of Appalachian clogging and related percussive step dance styles. The show, which was advertised as "America's response to Riverdance!", had a successful, weekend run at the Diana Wortham Theatre in Asheville.

Bernstein won first place at the Mount Airy Fiddler's Convention old-time flatfoot dance competition (in 1989, 1991, 1994, 1997, and 2005). He has also won awards at the Old Fiddler's Convention in Galax, Virginia, and at the Appalachian String Band Music Festival in Clifftop, Fayette County, West Virginia (first place in 2000, 2004, 2006, 2007, 2008, 2009, and 2010).

Books
1984 - American Clogging Steps and Notation
1992 - Appalachian Clogging and Flatfooting Steps

Discography
1988 - Ira Bernstein: Ten Toe Percussion: Clog, Tap, and Step Dancing  (Global Village Music, C-307)
2002 - Appalachian Roots: Ira Bernstein and Riley Baugus (Yodel-Ay-Hee, CD-0046)

Films
1988 - The Ten Toe Percussion Ensemble in Concert (concert performance)
1989 - Great Performances: Dance in America: Tap Dance in America with Gregory Hines (PBS)
1994 - Ira Bernstein LIVE! at the Alte Oper (concert performance)
1996 - Flatfooting Workshop (instructional)
2002 - Ira Bernstein Live and Un-Cut from the Pardoe Theatre (concert performance)

References

External links
Ira Bernstein official site
Article about Ira Bernstein
Appalachian Roots site

American male dancers
American tap dancers
1959 births
People from Malverne, New York
Musicians from Asheville, North Carolina
University of Pennsylvania alumni
Appalachian old-time fiddlers
Jewish American musicians
American people of Russian-Jewish descent
People from Marlboro, Vermont
Living people
Members of the United States National Academy of Sciences
21st-century American Jews